Conscription in Denmark is mandatory for all physically fit men over the age of 18, according to the Constitution of Denmark, §81 and the Danish Law of Conscription, §2. The service lasts between 4 and 12 months. Women may participate, but are not obligated to conscription. Under the Danish Realm and protected by the Danish Defence, men from Greenland and the Faroe Islands are not required to serve as conscripts.

History 
Conscription has been practised in Denmark since the Viking Age, where one physical man of every 10th court was required to serve the king. Frederick IV of Denmark changed the law in 1710 to every 4th court. The men were chosen by the landowner, with being chosen being seen as a penalty.

Since 12 February 1849, all physically fit men are obligated to conscription, according to the Constitution of Denmark, which was founded in the same year. Conscripts were required to wear their uniform on leave until 1966.

Regulation 

According to §81 of the Constitution of Denmark, every Danish male adult has to complete military service. The legislation of the compulsory military service is articulated in the Danish Law of Conscription. The national service lasts between 4 & 12 months. It is possible to postpone the conscription until his education is complete.

Women are not obligated to conscription.

'Day of Defence' 
Every male over the age of 18 will be drafted into the 'Day of Defence' (forsvarets dag), where they will be introduced to the Danish military and have their health tested. Men who are not physically fit are not required to participate in the draw Men considered healthy or partially capable have to participate in the draw, while women have the right to complete conscription same as men.

Drawing 
Physically fit people and partially fit people have to draw a number. Men deemed partially capable draw a number but do not have to serve their conscription if they choose not to, even if it is a number where a physically fit man would have to serve. Men determined to be physically healthy can be forced to fulfil their conscription, depending on which number they draw. The numbers 8,000-36,000 (frinumre) will not lead to conscription in peacetime. The numbers 1–8,000 can lead to conscription — even in peacetime — if there are not enough volunteers.

Service
Conscripts in the Danish Defence (Army, Navy and Air Force) generally serve 4 months, except:
 Conscripts of the Guard Hussar Regiment Mounted Squadron, who serve 12 months.
 Conscripts with Cyber-conscription, who serve 10 months.
 Conscripts aboard the Royal Yacht Dannebrog, who serve 9 months.
 Conscripts in the Danish Emergency Management Agency, who serve 9 months.
 Conscripts in the Royal Life Guards, who serve 8 months.

Military and non-military duty 
According to the Danish Law of Conscription from 12 December 2003, §2, one must provide conscription for the military (the Danish Defence) or perform a non-military duty, for example in the Danish Emergency Management Agency, as an aid worker in a developing country or, if a conscientious objector (militærnægter), in the civil service. Voluntary service in the armed forces or emergency services can, according to rules set by the Minister of Defence, take the place of military service.

Number of participants 
In 2006, 76% of conscripts were volunteers, a number which rose to 99.1% in 2014. The other 0.9% (19 individuals) were forced to serve in the military.

In 2012, the number of conscripts was lowered from 5,000 participants to 4,200 participants. This is being upheld until 2020.

Rights

To protect the rights of the conscripts, the Conscription Council was created in 1968. It works as an independent Trade union and is focused on handling the interests of the conscripts.

Criticism 
The topic is heavily criticized on grounds of gender discrimination, involuntary servitude and economic reasons. According to a poll from July 2011, 2 out of 3 Danes want conscription abolished.

Rank insignia

See also 
 Conscription
 Military service

References 

Denmark
Military of Denmark